Biagio Goggio (1 January 1892 – 28 July 1915) was an Italian footballer who played as a midfielder. On 29 March 1914, he represented the Italy national football team on the occasion of a friendly match against France in a 2–0 home win.

References

1892 births
1915 deaths
Italian footballers
Italy international footballers
Association football midfielders
Torino F.C. players
Juventus F.C. players